Yelagin or Elagin (feminine: Yelagina, Elagina) is a Russian-language surname. It may refer to:

 , Russian noble family
 Ekaterina Elagina, geologist, discoverer of the deposits of the Mir diamond mine
 Ivan Elagin (poet) (1918–1987), Russuan Emigre poet
 Ivan Yelagin (1725–1794), Russian historian and poet, unofficial secretary to Catherine the Great
  (1934–2007), Ukrainian poet
  (1817–1891), Russian writer and notorious censor
 Olga Elagin, poet Olga Anstei
 Vasily Igorevich Yelagin, Russian mountaineer and explorer
  (1743–?), Russian general
 Vladimir Yelagin (born 1955), Russian politician

Fictional characters
Yelagin, the protagonist of Ivan Bunin's novella Case of Cornet Yelagin

Russian-language surnames